György Grozer (born 27 November 1984), also known as Georg Grozer, is a German volleyball player of Hungarian origin, a member of the Germany men's national volleyball team and Italian club Vero Volley Monza, a bronze medalist of the 2014 World Championship, two–time German Champion (2009, 2010), Polish Champion (2012), Russian Champion (2013), Chinese Champion (2017).

Personal life
Grozer was born in Budapest, Hungary. His father György Grozer Senior is a former volleyball player and coach. With his first wife Violetta he has two daughters - Leana (born 2007) and Loreen (born 2010).

Career

Clubs
He was crowned national champion on two occasions, in 2009 and 2010, while playing for VfB Friedrichshafen. After moving to the Polish league he was Polish champion in his second season (2011/2012) with Asseco Resovia Rzeszów. He then moved to Belgorod where, in the early stages of the season, he played a major role in the team's success in the Russian championship and in the National Cup of Russia.
This season he won the Super Cup and the National Cup in Russia, and was crowned the top club team in Europe with Belgorod. In 2017 Grozer back to Russia Super League join to Lokomotiv Novosibirsk.

National team
2011 Grozer could not help the German team because of an injury. In 2012 the dynamic and powerful hitter smashed the German team to the Olympics and to the 5th place in London. In 2014 played at World Championship 2014 held in Poland. Germany won the match for the bronze medal by defeating France.

Sporting achievements

Clubs
 CEV Champions League
  2013/2014 – with Belogorie Belgorod

 FIVB Club World Championship
  Brazil 2014 – with Belogorie Belgorod

 CEV Cup
  2011/2012 – with Asseco Resovia
  2021/2022 – with Vero Volley Monza

 National championships
 2008/2009  German Championship, with VfB Friedrichshafen
 2009/2010  German Championship, with VfB Friedrichshafen
 2011/2012  Polish Championship, with Asseco Resovia
 2012/2013  Russian Championship, with Belogorie Belgorod
 2014/2015  Russian Championship, with Belogorie Belgorod
 2016/2017  Chinese Championship, with Shanghai Golden Age
 2016/2017  Qatari Cup, with Al Arabi Doha

Individual awards
 2008: European League – Best Scorer
 2009: European League – Best Blocker
 2010: German Volleyball Player of the Year
 2011: German Volleyball Player of the Year
 2012: German Volleyball Player of the Year
 2012: Best Player in PlusLiga
 2012: Memorial of Hubert Jerzy Wagner – Best Server
 2013: German Volleyball Player of the Year
 2014: German Volleyball Player of the Year
 2016: Asian Club Championship – Best Opposite Spiker
 2017: Asian Club Championship – Best Opposite Spiker
 2017: CEV European Championship – Best Opposite Spiker

Records
39 points in one match – Olympic Games 2012 record

 15 aces in one match in Korean League.

References

External links

 
 
 
 Player profile at LegaVolley.it 
 Player profile at PlusLiga.pl 
 Player profile at Volleybox.net
 

1984 births
Living people
German people of Hungarian descent
Volleyball players from Budapest
Hungarian men's volleyball players
German men's volleyball players
Olympic volleyball players of Germany
Volleyball players at the 2012 Summer Olympics
German Champions of men's volleyball
Polish Champions of men's volleyball
Russian Champions of men's volleyball
German expatriate sportspeople in Italy
Expatriate volleyball players in Italy
German expatriate sportspeople in Poland
Expatriate volleyball players in Poland
German expatriate sportspeople in Russia
Expatriate volleyball players in Russia
German expatriate sportspeople in Qatar
Expatriate volleyball players in Qatar
German expatriate sportspeople in South Korea
Expatriate volleyball players in South Korea
German expatriate sportspeople in China
Expatriate volleyball players in China
Resovia (volleyball) players
VC Belogorie players
Daejeon Samsung Bluefangs players
VC Zenit Saint Petersburg players
Opposite hitters